The Ignorance of Blood is a 2014 Spanish thriller film directed by Manuel Gómez Pereira and written by Nicolás Saad which stars Juan Diego Botto and Paz Vega alongside Alberto San Juan, Cuca Escribano and Francesc Garrido.

Cast

References

External links
 
 

Films shot in Madrid
Films shot in Morocco
Films with screenplays by Nicolás Saad
Films directed by Manuel Gómez Pereira
Films scored by Federico Jusid
Maestranza Films films
Tornasol Films films
2010s Spanish films